Paulino Masip Roca (11 May 1899 – 21 September 1963) was a Spanish playwright, screenwriter and novelist. Driven into exile in Mexico in 1939 by the events of the Spanish Civil War, he became involved with the nascent Golden age of Mexican cinema and was the author of over 50 screenplays. Masip is best known for his novel ¨El Diario de Hamlet Garcia¨ which takes place during the Spanish Civil War.

Selected filmography
 Rough But Respectable (1949)
 The Three Elenas (1954)
 Look What Happened to Samson (1955)

References

1899 births
1963 deaths
People from Garrigues (comarca)
Writers from Catalonia
Spanish male dramatists and playwrights
Spanish male novelists
Generation of '27
Male screenwriters
20th-century Spanish novelists
20th-century Spanish dramatists and playwrights
20th-century Spanish male writers
20th-century Spanish screenwriters